Pavel Štys (8 December 1933 – 24 August 2018) was a Czech entomologist who specialized mainly on the Heteroptera and a professor of zoology at the Charles University, Prague.

Štys was born to Ludmila (1896–1976) and Jaroslav (1897–1963) in a farming family in South Bohemia. An uncle was a co-owner of an optical instrument manufacturer Srb & Štys. He was educated at Vančurovo Reálné Gymnasium before joining Charles University, Prague graduating in 1957. He received a C.Sc.(equivalent to a Ph.D.) in 1966 and joined the faculty at the university. He became a professor of entomology in 1993 and became a head of the zoology department in 1998. He was also a visiting professor at several universities.

References 

Czechoslovak entomologists
1933 births
2018 deaths
Charles University alumni
Academic staff of Charles University